Middleton and Prestwich was a parliamentary constituency centred on the Middleton and Prestwich districts of Greater Manchester.  It returned one Member of Parliament (MP)  to the House of Commons of the Parliament of the United Kingdom.

The constituency was created for the 1918 general election, and abolished for the 1983 general election, when it was partially replaced by the new constituencies of Heywood and Middleton and Bury South. Its member from 1974 to the seat's abolition was Jim Callaghan, who happened to share his name with the Labour Prime Minister.

It was an unusual constituency, because Middleton and Prestwich were physically separated by Heaton Park, a large green area bequeathed to Manchester City Council, and had nothing whatsoever in common. Prestwich was a well established middle class suburb with a large Jewish minority, and during the inter-war years boasted several millionaires. Middleton, on the other hand, was greatly expanded by a large Manchester overspill council estate, and at one point during the 1950s, Prestwich had no Labour councillors, while Middleton had no Conservatives. The new constituency of Heywood and Middleton in 1983 resolved this mismatch by linking together the two adjacent towns in the Rochdale borough, and was held by Labour right up to 2019. Prestwich joined neighbouring towns Radcliffe and Whitefield in the Bury Council area to become Bury South which was gained by the Conservatives until 1997 when it was lost to Labour, who held it up to 2019 when it was regained by the Conservatives. 
The 2018 Boundary Commission Review, which aimed to reduce the number of MPs from 650 to 600, and was subsequently shelved, had proposed to restore the Prestwich and Middleton seat.

Boundaries

1918–1950: The Borough of Middleton, and the Urban Districts of Chadderton and Prestwich.

1950–1983: The Boroughs of Middleton and Prestwich, and the Urban District of Whitefield.

Members of Parliament

Elections

Elections in the 1910s

Elections in the 1920s

Elections in the 1930s

Elections in the 1940s 
General Election 1939–40:
Another General Election was required to take place before the end of 1940. The political parties had been making preparations for an election to take place from 1939 and by the end of this year, the following candidates had been selected; 
Conservative: Ernest Gates
Labour: Mabel Tylecote
However, the sitting MP, Nairne Sandeman, died on 23 April 1940, resulting in a by-election. Due to an electoral pact during World War II not to contest by-elections, the Labour candidate did not stand.

Elections in the 1950s

Elections in the 1960s

Elections in the 1970s

References

Parliamentary constituencies in North West England (historic)
Constituencies of the Parliament of the United Kingdom established in 1918
Constituencies of the Parliament of the United Kingdom disestablished in 1983
Middleton, Greater Manchester